Syngrapha alias, the hooked silver Y,  is a moth of the family Noctuidae. The species was first described by Rodrigues Ottolengui in 1902. It is found in North America from Newfoundland to Alaska and Vancouver Island, north to near the treeline and south in the west to coastal north California and Arizona, in the east to North Carolina.

The wingspan is 30–34 mm. The moth flies from June to August depending on the location.

The larvae feed on Picea glauca and Picea mariana.

Subspecies
There are two recognised subspecies:
Syngrapha alias alias
Syngrapha alias interalia

References

Plusiinae
Moths of North America
Moths described in 1902